Admiral Percy may refer to:

Algernon Percy, 10th Earl of Northumberland (1602–1668), English Lord High Admiral
Henry Percy, 1st Earl of Northumberland (1341–1408), English Admiral of the Northern Seas
Josceline Percy (Royal Navy officer) (1784–1856), British Royal Navy vice admiral
Thomas Percy, Earl of Worcester (1343–1403), English Admiral of the Kings Fleet in Ireland
William Henry Percy (1788–1855), British Royal Navy rear admiral